Allan Fernando Oviedo Rodríguez (born November 8, 1970) is a retired Costa Rican football striker.

Club career
After winning promotion with the club, Oviedo made his Primera División debut for Sagrada Familia on 3 September 1994 against Turrialba and scored his first goal for them on 24 September 1994 against Limonense. He then joined Belén and in May 1996 he moved abroad to play a month for Salvadoran side FAS. On his return in Costa Rica, he won the 1996–1997 goalscorer award with 26 goals for Herediano only to leave the club in December 1997 when he signed a six-months contract with Mexican second division team Unión de Curtidores. He stayed another year with the club when joined by compatriots Alexander Madrigal and Raymond Harris. Later in 1999 he played for Guatemalan giants Comunicaciones and a half season at Herediano.

In 2001 Oviedo left another Mexican second division side, Tigrillos Nuevo León, and became part of a championship-winning Alajuelense, before moving on to Cartaginés, Puntarenas, Belén and finishing his career at Brujas.

Oviedo totalled 105 Costa Rica premier league goals in his career.

International career
A rather short striker, Oviedo made his debut for Costa Rica in an August 1996 friendly match against Chile and earned a total of 26 caps, scoring 7 goals. He represented his country in 9 FIFA World Cup qualification matches and played at the 1997 UNCAF Nations Cup as well as at the 1998 CONCACAF Gold Cup and the 1997 Copa América.

His final international was an August 1999 friendly match against Uruguay.

International goals
Scores and results list Costa Rica's goal tally first.

Personal life
He is a son of Fernando Oviedo and Virginia Rodríguez and married to Reyani Miranda López. Allan and Reyani have three children.

References

External links

1970 births
Living people
People from Alajuela
Association football forwards
Costa Rican footballers
Costa Rica international footballers
1997 Copa América players
1998 CONCACAF Gold Cup players
Belén F.C. players
C.D. FAS footballers
C.S. Herediano footballers
Unión de Curtidores footballers
Comunicaciones F.C. players
L.D. Alajuelense footballers
C.S. Cartaginés players
Puntarenas F.C. players
Brujas FC players
Costa Rican expatriate footballers
Expatriate footballers in El Salvador
Expatriate footballers in Mexico
Expatriate footballers in Guatemala
Copa Centroamericana-winning players
Liga FPD players